Cecil Williams may refer to:

 Cecil Williams (anti-apartheid activist) (1909–1979), English-South African theatre director and anti-apartheid activist
 Cecil Williams (cricketer) (1926–1998), Barbadian cricketer and diplomat
 Cecil Williams (pastor) (born 1929), pastor, community leader and author
 Cecil J. Williams (born 1937), American photographer, publisher and author